The Dent de Ruth is a mountain in the Bernese Alps in Switzerland. The summit is the tripoint between the cantons of Vaud, Berne and Fribourg.

References

External links
 Dent de Ruth on Hikr

Mountains of the Alps
Mountains of Switzerland
Mountains of the canton of Vaud
Mountains of the canton of Fribourg
Mountains of the canton of Bern
Bern–Vaud border
Fribourg–Vaud border
Bern–Fribourg border
Two-thousanders of Switzerland